The Lt. Donald MacLaughlin Jr. Award — also known as the "Don MacLaughlin Award" — has been given annually since 1973 by the United States Intercollegiate Lacrosse Association (USILA) to the NCAA's most outstanding college lacrosse midfielder.  The award is presented to the best midfielder in Division I, Division II, and — until recently — Division III.  The outstanding midfielder in Division III now receives the new "Fran McCall Award".  Also, the new "Long Pole Midfielder of the Year" award is given in Divisions II and III.

The award is named after LTJG Donald Clay MacLaughlin, Jr, USN, United States Naval Academy (USNA), Class of 1963, Catonsville High School, Class of 1959. An All-American midfielder for Navy, who died on a combat mission in South Vietnam in 1966.

MacLaughlin was a leading midfielder and scorer on three consecutive Division 1 National Championship Navy Lacrosse Teams ('61, '62, '63), and First Team All-American. He was also an All-American and Captain of the 1963 Navy Soccer team, leading Navy to its first appearance in the final NCAA Division-1 championship game. As USNA's best athlete, "Mac" was awarded the U.S. Naval Academy's most prestigious, athletic award, "The Sword", presented by the Naval Academy Athletic Association (NAAA).

Award winners by year (Division I)

Number of awards by school (Division I)

See also
United States Navy Memorial#Other Navy memorials
Jack Turnbull Award
Lt. Raymond Enners Award
Schmeisser Award

References

College lacrosse trophies and awards in the United States
Awards established in 1973